Ray Franz may refer to:

 Raymond Franz (1922–2010), member of the Governing Body of Jehovah's Witnesses
 Ray Franz (politician), member of the Michigan House of Representatives